born as Yasui Santetsu, later called Motoi Santetsu, was a Japanese scholar, go player and the first official astronomer appointed of the Edo period. He revised the Chinese lunisolar calendar at the shogunate request, drawing up the Jōkyō calendar which was issued in 1684 during the Jōkyō era. In 1702, he changed his name to Shibukawa Sukezaemon Shunkai and retired by 1711. As a go player, he was affiliated with the Yasui house, calling himself initially (after his father) Yasui Santetsu II. He is mentioned as a Tengen player in Yamashita Keigo 's book: Challenging Tengen.

Shibukawa Shunkai (as Yasui Santetsu) is the central character in the 2012 film Tenchi: The Samurai Astronomer by Yōjirō Takita.

Notes

1639 births
1715 deaths
18th-century Japanese astronomers
Science and technology during the Edo period
17th-century Japanese astronomers
Japanese Go players
17th-century Go players